The final round of the 2014 FIBA Basketball World Cup is the knockout stage of the competition. The top four teams from the preliminary round groups shall qualify in the single-elimination tournament. The losers in the semifinals will play for the bronze medal. Teams from Groups A and B shall play at the Palacio de Deportes de la Comunidad de Madrid in Madrid, while those from Groups C and D shall play at the Palau Sant Jordi in Barcelona. The third place game and the final shall be held at the Madrid arena.

The order of games for the round of 16 and quarterfinals shall be determined after the teams are known.

Qualified teams

Bracket

All times are local UTC+2.

Round of 16

United States vs. Mexico
This would be the third game between the United States and Mexico in the World Cup; the United States won the first two games in 1963 and 1967. The most recent competitive game between the two was an American victory at the 2007 FIBA Americas Championship.

Team USA rolled past Mexico in the first game of the final round. Stephen Curry scored 20 points, including 6 three point field goals, for the United States. Gustavo Ayón recorded 25 points and 8 rebounds for Mexico.

France vs. Croatia
This would be France's and Croatia's first World Cup game against each other. The French had previously won their last competitive match at FIBA EuroBasket 2009.

Dominican Republic vs. Slovenia
This would be the first competitive game between the Dominican Republic and Slovenia.

Spain vs. Senegal
This would be Spain's and Senegal's first World Cup game against each other. Spain had previously defeated Senegal at the 1980 Olympics, their last competitive game between the two of them.

New Zealand vs. Lithuania
This would be the second competitive game between New Zealand and Lithuania at the World Cup; the Lithuanians had won the first meeting at the 2010 FIBA World Championship.

Serbia vs. Greece
This would be Serbia's and Greece's first World Cup game against each other. Greece had previously won their last competitive match at FIBA EuroBasket 2011.

Turkey vs. Australia
This would be the second competitive game between Turkey and Australia at the World Cup; Turkey had won the first meeting at the 2006 FIBA World Championship.

Brazil vs. Argentina
This would be the second consecutive time that these two teams will meet in a World Cup round of 16; Argentina won in 2010. Argentina won in the last competitive game at the 2011 FIBA Americas Championship.

Quarterfinals

Lithuania vs. Turkey
This would be the third time Lithuania and Turkey played against each other at the World Cup. Turkey won their first two games, both at the 2006 FIBA World Championship.

United States vs. Slovenia
This would be the third competitive game between the United States and Slovenia. The Americans have won both previous meetings, at the 2006 and 2010 FIBA World Championship.

Serbia vs. Brazil
This would be the second time in this tournament that these two teams met. Brazil earlier defeated Serbia in the preliminary round.

Spain vs. France
This would be the second time in this tournament that these two teams met. Spain earlier defeated France in the preliminary round.

Semifinals

Lithuania vs. United States
This would be the second consecutive time that both teams would meet in a World Cup semifinal; in 2010, the Americans won en route to the championship. The last time the two teams met was a USA victory in the 2012 Olympics.

France vs. Serbia
This would be the second time in this tournament that these two teams met. France earlier defeated Serbia in the preliminary round.

Third place playoff

Final
In the final Serbia hit their first seven shots from the field and jumped out to a quick 15-7 lead.  The advantage was short lived as the U.S went on a 14-0 run with all the points scored by Kyrie Irving and James Harden.  Irving finished the first half with 18 points on 7 of 9 shooting from the field.  He made all four of his three point attempts in the first half.  DeMarcus Cousins, subbing for Anthony Davis who picked up two quick fouls, dominated the boards.  As a team, the Americans made 12 of their first 16 treys.

External links

 
 

final